The Miglin-Beitler Skyneedle was a proposed 125-floor skyscraper intended for Chicago, Illinois, United States, by Lee Miglin and J. Paul Beitler's firm Miglin-Beitler Developments and designed by architect César Pelli. The site of the proposed Skyneedle now is host to a parking garage.

The tower's plans were unveiled in 1988. The plans would falter due to the post-Gulf War market downturn. Miglin-Beitler held hopes of reviving the project, but these were dashed by the murder of Lee Miglin.

The tower would have risen 125 floors and 1,999 feet. It would have had 1.9 million square feet of space (with 1.2 million being office space). It was planned to cost $450 million to construct. As of July 1990, it was tentatively planned to open in 1993.

The firm had believed that the observation deck planned atop the tower, as well as the twelve floors of parking at its lower levels, would produce large amounts of revenue. Plans also called for the building to include a two-story health club. Office space in the building would have been marketed to smaller yet prestigious firms. The goal was to attract law firms and other tenants desiring a high-status location, but needing only between 8,000 and 10,000 square feet of office space.

There were a number of challenges faced by the project before the post-Gulf War economic downturned ultimately doomed it. This included the earlier savings and loan crisis putting in place a stricter regulatory climate for banks and credit unions, which made many financial institutions wary of large real estate projects as investments. Another challenge was that the Chicago real estate market, particularly in its downtown, was "soft". The downtown had an office space vacancy rate of 14%, which was on the rise. Additionally, millions of additional square feet of office space was already under construction in downtown Chicago, with millions more to open up with Sears moving out of the Sears Tower for a new suburban headquarters. Another challenge that analysts predicted was that larger corporate tenants might avoid the building, as its narrow floorplates would require firms needing larger amounts of office space to locate their offices across several floors. This potential aversion to the building by larger firms could prevent the building from attracting large "anchor" tenants.

Miglin–Beitler had experience with developing office buildings in the area of the city that the tower was to stand. Across Wells Street from the site where the tower was to be built is another Pelli project previously developed by Miglin-Beitler, 181 West Madison Street, which reportedly inspired the general design of the Skyneedle. Visually the upper floors of the Skyneedle do appear to be similar to a stretched 181 W Madison. Across  Madison Street from the site where the tower was to be built is 200 West Madison, another building developed previously by Miglin-Beitler.

César Pelli also designed the Petronas Towers in Kuala Lumpur. The Petronas Towers have an obvious design reference, with the exception of having round floorplates as opposed to square ones.

References

External links
Miglin-Beitler Skyneedle

Skyscrapers in Chicago
Unbuilt skyscrapers